This is a list of famous people who have lived in Saint Petersburg, Russia (1914–1924: Petrograd, 1924–1991: Leningrad).

Born in Saint Petersburg

1701–1800 
 Peter II of Russia (1715–1730) Emperor of Russia from 1727 to 1730.
 Franz Moritz von Lacy (1725–1801), son of Count Peter von Lacy and a famous Austrian field marshal.
 Dmitri Alekseyevich Gallitzin (1728–1803), diplomat, art agent, author, volcanologist and mineralogist
 Johann Euler (1734–1800), Swiss-Russian astronomer and mathematician
 John Julius Angerstein (1735–1823) a London businessman and Lloyd's underwriter.
 Ivan VI of Russia (1740–1764), Emperor of Russia, 1740–1741.
 Ivan Lepyokhin (1740–1802), naturalist, zoologist, botanist and explorer
 Mikhail Kutuzov (1745–1813), Field Marshal of the Russian Empire.
 Nikolay Rumyantsev (1754–1826), Russia's Foreign Minister and Imperial Chancellor
 Mikhail Miloradovich (1771–1825), Russian general of Serbian origin
 Thomas Tooke (1774 in Kronstadt – 1858) an English economist.
 Catharina of Württemberg (1783–1835), second wife of Jérôme Bonaparte, Queen consort of Westphalia (1807–1813)
 Joseph Bové (1784–1834), Russian neoclassical architect with Italian roots
 Pavel Kridener (1784–1852), Russian diplomat, the fourth Russian Ambassador to the United States
 Michael Lunin (1787–1845), political philosopher, revolutionary, Mason, Decembrist and a participant of the Franco-Russian Patriotic War of 1812
 Catherine Pavlovna of Russia (1788–1819), the fourth daughter of Emperor Paul I of Russia, Queen consort of Württemberg (1816–1819)
 Sylvester Shchedrin (1791–1830), landscape painter
 Grand Duchess Olga Pavlovna of Russia (1792–1795), Grand Duchess of Russia as the second youngest daughter and seventh child of Emperor Paul I of Russia
 Maria Danilova (1793–1810), Russian ballet dancer
 Nikolay Muravyov-Karsky (1794–1866), Imperial Russian military officer and General of the Russian Army
 Konstantin Thon (1794–1881), official architect of Imperial Russia during the reign of Nicholas I
 Sergey Muravyov-Apostol (1796–1826), Russian Imperial Lieutenant Colonel and organizer of the Decembrist revolt
 Nicholas I of Russia (1796–1855), Emperor of Russia, 1825–1855.
 Wilhelm Küchelbecker (1797–1846), Romantic poet and Decembrist
 Fyodor Litke (1797–1882), navigator, geographer and Arctic explorer
 Karl Bryullov (1799–1852), painter
 Countess of Ségur (1799–1874), French writer of Russian birth

1801–1830 
 Alexander Odoevsky (1802–1839), poet and playwright
 Alexis Guignard, comte de Saint-Priest (1805–1851), French diplomat, historian, and Peer of France
 Alexander Andreyevich Ivanov (1806–1858), painter, born and died in Saint Petersburg
 George Busk (1807–1886), British Naval surgeon, zoologist and palaeontologist.
 Nestor Kukolnik (1809–1868), Russian playwright and prose writer of Carpatho-Rusyn origin
 Nikolay Muravyov-Amursky (1809–1881), statesman and diplomat
 Alexandre Remi (1809–1871), mayor-general, brother officer of Mikhail Lermontov, born in Saint Petersburg
 Ivan Panaev (1812–1862), publisher of the popular magazine Sovremennik
 Anatoly Demidov (1813–1870), industrialist, diplomat and arts patron of the Demidov family
 Nikolay Ogarev (1813–1877), poet, historian and political activist
 Vladimir Sollogub (1813–1882), writer
 Alexander von Stieglitz (1814–1884), philanthropist and financier
 Eugene Balabin (1815–1895), Roman Catholic priest and a member of the Society of Jesus
 Otto von Böhtlingk (1815–1904), German Indologist and Sanskrit scholar
 Alexander von Middendorff (1815–1894), zoologist and explorer
 Count Nikolay Adlerberg (1819–1892), Councilor of State, Chamberlain, governor of Taganrog, Simferopol and Finland
 Avdotya Panaeva (1820–1893), novelist, short story writer, memoirist and literary salon holder
 Alexander Serov (1820–1871), composer and music critic
 Mikhail Petrashevsky (1821–1866), thinker and public figure
 Boleslav Markevich (1822–1884), writer, essayist, journalist and literary critic
 Vladimir Stasov (1824–1906), the most respected Russian critic during his lifetime, born and died in Saint Petersburg
 Percy Smythe, 8th Viscount Strangford (1825–1869) a British nobleman and man of letters.
 Aleksey Uvarov (1825–1884), archaeologist
 Otto Pius Hippius (1826–1883), Baltic German architect
 Pyotr Shuvalov (1827–1889), influential Russian statesman and a counselor to Emperor Alexander II
 Charles Sillem Lidderdale (1830–1895), British artist

1831–1850 
 Nikolay Pavlovich Ignatyev (1832–1908), statesman and diplomat.
 Mikhail Clodt (1832–1902), realistic painter, born and died in Saint Petersburg
 Alexander Borodin (1833–1887), composer and chemist.
 Viktor Hartmann (1834–1873), architect and painter
 Nikolai Pomyalovsky (1835–1863), writer
 Mitrofan Belyayev (1836–1904), Imperial Russian music publisher, philanthropist
 Mariia Surovshchikova-Petipa (1836–1886), Russian prima ballerina, wife of Marius Petipa and mother of Marie Petipa
 John Codman Ropes (1836–1899) an American military historian and lawyer.
 Anna Filosofova (1837–1912), feminist
 Franz Overbeck (1837–1905), German Protestant theologian
 Friedrich Konrad Beilstein (1838–1906), chemist
 Dmitry Chernov (1839–1921), metallurgist
 Ingeborg Bronsart von Schellendorf (1840–1913), Finnish-German composer
 Alexander W. von Götte (1840–1922), German zoologist
 Woldemar Kernig (1840–1917), internist and neurologist
 Princess Maria Maximilianovna of Leuchtenberg (1841–1914), daughter of Maximilian de Beauharnais, 3rd Duke of Leuchtenberg
 Nikolai Menshutkin (1842–1907), chemist
 Friedrich Heinrich Stöckhardt (1842–1920), architect, born in Saint Petersburg, left it as a child about 1848
 Mikhail Skobelev (1843–1882), general famous for his conquest of Central Asia and heroism during the Russo-Turkish War
 Alexander III of Russia (1845–1894), Emperor of Russia, 1881–1894.
 Georg Cantor (1845–1918), German mathematician
 Bogomir Korsov (1845–1920), baritone opera singer
 Vladimir Lamsdorf (1845–1907), statesman, Foreign Minister of the Russian Empire (1900–1906)
 Ella Adayevskaya (1846–1926), pianist and composer
 Alexandr von Bilderling (1846–1912), general in the Imperial Russian Army
 Anna Dostoyevskaya (1846–1918), memoirist, stenographer, assistant, and the second wife of Fyodor Dostoyevsky
 Peter Carl Fabergé (1846–1920), jeweller
 Wladimir Köppen (1846–1940), German geographer, meteorologist, climatologist and botanist
 Rafail Levitsky (1847–1940), photographer, artist, professor
 Jean Béraud (1849–1935), French painter

1851–1860 
 Walter W. Winans (1852–1920), American marksman, horse breeder, sculptor, and painter
 Nikolai Reitsenstein (1854–1916), career naval officer in the Imperial Russian Navy
 Vladimir Golenishchev (1856–1947), Egyptologist
 Marie Petipa (1857–1930), Russian ballerina and the daughter of Marius Petipa and Mariia Surovshchikova-Petipa
 Leopold Engel (1858–1931), writer and occultist
 Princess Maria Tenisheva (1858–1928), Princess, a public person, artist, educator, philanthropist and collector
 Emanuel Nobel (1859–1932), Swedish-Russian oil baron
 Nikolai Essen (1860–1915), naval commander and admiral
 Victor Ewald (1860–1935), composer
 Maria Blumenthal-Tamarina (1859–1938), actress

1861–1870 
 Lou Andreas-Salomé (1861–1937), Russian-born psychoanalyst and author
 Arvid Järnefelt (1861–1932), Finnish judge and writer
 Feodor Yulievich Levinson-Lessing (1861–1939), Russian geologist
 Konstantin Fofanov (1862–1911), poet
 Fyodor Sologub (1863–1927), poet and writer
 Vladimir Vernadsky (1863–1945), one of the founders of geochemistry
 Alexander Glazunov (1865–1936), composer.
 Dmitry Merezhkovsky (1866–1941) a Russian novelist, poet, religious thinker and literary critic.
 Mikhail Eisenstein (1867–1921), architect and civil engineer of Baltic German descent
 Nicholas II of Russia (1868–1918), Emperor of Russia, 1894–1917.
 Vasily Bartold (1869–1930), historian
 Nikolay Pushnitsky (1870–1921), sailor
 Vera Karelina (1870–1931), labour activist and revolutionary

1871–1880 
 Fyodor Dan (1871–1947), one of the founding leaders of Menshevism
 Olga Preobrajenska (1871–1962), Russian ballerina of the Russian Imperial Ballet and a ballet instructor
 Alexandra Kollontai (1872–1952), revolutionary, writer and diplomat
 Mathilde Kschessinska (1872–1971), Russian ballerina from a family of Polish origin
 George Washington Lambert (1873–1930), Australian artist
 Vladimir Fyodorov (1874–1966), scientist, weapons designer, professor, lieutenant general of a corps of military engineers
 Nicholas Roerich (1874–1947), painter and writer
 Noë Bloch (1875–1937), film producer
 Carl Enckell (1876–1959), Finnish politician, officer and diplomat
 Herman Gummerus (1877–1948), Finnish classical scholar and diplomat
 Lev Urusov (1877–1933), Russian diplomat, member of International Olympic Committee
 Pavel Pototsky (engineer) (1879-1932), Polish engineer, born in Saint Petersburg
 Agrippina Vaganova (1879–1951), legendary Russian-Armenian ballet teacher and the creator of Vaganova method
 Peter P. von Weymarn (1879–1935), Russian chemist
 Alexander Blok (1880–1921), lyrical poet
 Michel Fokine (1880–1942), choreographer and dancer, born in Saint Petersburg and worked there

1881–1890 
 Anna Pavlova (1881–1931), prima ballerina, born in Saint Petersburg, lived and performed in Russia
 Mikhail Avilov (1882–1954), painter and art educator
 Igor Stravinsky (1882–1971), composer, pianist and conductor, born in a suburb of Saint Petersburg
 Viktor Bulla (1883–1938), photographer and cinema pioneer
 Leopold van der Pals (1884–1966), composer
 Stella Arbenina (1885–1976), Russian-born English actress
 Ivan Abramovich Zalkind (1885–1928), Soviet diplomat
 Sacha Guitry (1885–1957), French stage actor, film actor, director, screenwriter
 Naum Idelson (1885–1951), Soviet theoretical astronomer and expert in history of physics and mathematics
 Tamara Karsavina (1885–1978), renowned Russian prima ballerina
 Lydia Kyasht (1885–1959), Russian British ballerina and dance teacher
 Nikolay Gumilyov (1886–1921), poet
 Elsa Brändström (1888–1948), Swedish nurse and philanthropist
 Alexander Friedmann (1888–1925), mathematician and physicist
 Fyodor Zabelin  (1888–unknown), Russian artistic gymnast 
 Ludmilla Schollar (1888–1978), Russian-American dancer and educator
 Serge Elisséeff (1889–1975), Russian-French scholar and professor
 Joseph Ruttenberg (1889–1983), Russian-American photojournalist and cinematographer
 Vladimir Rosing (1890–1963), opera singer and director, born in Saint Petersburg, emigrated to England in 1913

1891–1900 
 Semyon Kulikov (1891–unknown), Russian artistic gymnast
 Boris Morros (1891–1963), worked at Paramount Pictures, where he produced films and supervised the music department
 Alexander Rodchenko (1891–1956), artist, sculptor, photographer and graphic designer, born in Saint Petersburg
 Aleksei Uversky (1891–1942), football player
 Erté (1892–1990), designer and illustrator (born Roman Petrovich Tyrtov)
 Lydia Lopokova (1892–1981), Russian ballerina famous during the early 20th century.
 Xenia Makletzova (1892–1974), Russian ballet dancer
 Fyodor Raskolnikov (1892–1939), Bolshevik and Soviet diplomat
 Prince Paul of Yugoslavia (1893–1976), prince regent of Yugoslavia
 Pavel Kushnikov (1893–unknown), Russian artistic gymnast
 Robert Mertens (1894–1975), German herpetologist
 Vladimir Propp (1895–1970), folklorist and scholar
 Sasha Stone (1895–1940), Russian born artist, photographer
Vera Vinogradova (1895–1982), composer and pianist
 Mikhail Zoshchenko (1895–1958), writer, satirist
 Felia Doubrovska (1896–1981), Russian dancer and teacher
 Cleo Nordi (1898–1983), Russo-Finnish ballerina
 Vladimir Fock (1898–1974), physicist
 Pyotr Grigoryev (1899–1942), Soviet international footballer
 Vladimir Nabokov (1899–1977), writer, born in Saint Petersburg
 Pyotr Pavlenko (1899–1951), writer, born in Saint Petersburg
 Vera Fedorovna Gaze (1899–1954), astronomer, born in Saint Petersburg
 Eugène Vinaver (1899–1979), literary scholar
 Nina Anisimova (1900–1979), Russian ballerina and dance choreographer
 Nina Gagen-Torn (1900–1986), poet, writer, historian, ethnographer
 Léon Motchane (1900–1990), French industrialist and mathematician

1901–1910 
 Andrews Engelmann (1901–1992), Russian-born German actor
 Waldemar Gurian (1902–1954), German-American political scientist, author, and professor at the University of Notre Dame
 Véra Nabokov (1902–1991), wife, editor and translator of Russian writer Vladimir Nabokov
 Alexandra Danilova (1903–1997), Russian-born American prima ballerina
 Yevgeny Mravinsky (1903–1988), conductor
 George Balanchine (1904–1983), one of the 20th century's most prolific choreographers
 Colonel-General Nikolai Berzarin (1904–1945), appointed Soviet military commandant of Berlin in 1945; the Bersarinplatz in Berlin Friedrichshain was named in his honour
 Tom Conway (1904–1967), British film, television and radio actor
 Daniel Prenn (1904–1991), Russian-born German, Polish, and British world-top-ten tennis player
 Tamara Talbot Rice (1904–1993), Russian then English art historian
 Mischa Auer (1905–1967), actor
 Alexey Eisner (1905–1984), poet, translator and writer
 Natalia Gippius (1905–1994), artist
 Oleg Kerensky (1905–1984), civil engineer
 Daniil Kharms (1905–1942), writer and poet
 Ayn Rand (1905–1982), Russian-American novelist, born in Saint Petersburg
 Andria Balanchivadze (1906–1992), Georgian composer
 Dmitry Likhachov (1906–1999), philologist
 Illaria Obidenna Ladré (1906–1998), Russian ballet dancer
 Dmitri Shostakovich (1906–1975), composer and pianist, born in Saint Petersburg and spent most of his life there
 Evgenia Baykova (1907–1997), painter and graphic artist
 Vera Broido (1907–2004), writer
 Olga Sapphire (1907–1981), Russian Japanese ballerina and choreographer (Real Name: Olga Ivanovna Pavlova)
 Sofka Skipwith (1907–1994), Russian émigrée to England who became a well-known Communist after working for Laurence Olivier and being interned by the Nazis in France in World War II
 Vasily Solovyov-Sedoi (1907–1979), composer, born and died in Saint Petersburg
 Edmund Kurtz (1908–2004), cellist and music editor
 Ilya Frank (1908–1990), physicist
 Rostislaw Kaischew (1908–2002), Bulgarian physicochemist
 Alexandre Mnouchkine (1908–1993), French film producer
 Marina Semyonova (1908–2010), first Soviet-trained prima ballerina and 1975's People's Artist of the USSR
 Sergey Urusevsky (1908–1974), cinematographer and film director
 Boris Vildé (1908–1942), linguist and ethnographer
 Nina Anisimova (1909–1979), dancer and choreographer
 Anatole de Grunwald (1910–1967), Russian British film producer and screenwriter
 Barys Kit (1910–2018), rocket scientist
 Galina Ulanova (1910–1998), ballet dancer

1911–1920 
 Yrjö von Grönhagen (1911–2003), Finnish nobleman and anthropologist
 Nikolay Novotelnov (1911–2006), chess International Master and author
 David Shoenberg (1911–2004), British physicist
 Lev Gumilev (1912–1992), historian, ethnologist, anthropologist and translator
 Leonid Kantorovich (1912–1986), economist
 Varvara P. Mey (1912–1995), prima ballerina, ballet instructor and author
 Irina Nijinska (1913–1991), Russian-Polish ballet dancer 
 Valentina Khetagurova (1914–1992), founder of the Khetagurovite Campaign
 Assia Noris (1912–1998), Russian-Italian film actress
 Adrian von Fölkersam (1914–1945), German Waffen-SS officer in World War II
 Elena Shtaerman (1914–1991), Soviet scholar of Roman history, recipient of the State Prize of the USSR
 Dmitry Maevsky (1917–1992), Soviet Russian painter, lived and worked in Leningrad, a member of the Leningrad Union of Artists, regarded as one of representatives of the Leningrad school of painting
 Anna Marly (1917–2006), singer-songwriter
 Efim Etkind (1918–1999), philologist and translation theorist
 Nathalie Krassovska (1918–2005), Russian born prima ballerina and teacher of classical ballet
 Irina Baronova (1919–2008), Russian ballerina and actress 
 Galina Ustvolskaya (1919–2006), composer of classical music
 Tatiana Semenova (1920–1996), Russian-American ballet dancer, dance teacher, founded the Houston Ballet Academy
 Igor Karassik (1911-1995), Russian-American engineer known for his pioneering work with pumps

1921–1950 
 Aris Alexandrou (1922–1978), Greek novelist, poet and translator
 Juri Lotman (1922–1993), literary scholar, semiotician and cultural historian
 Boris Ugarov (1922–1991), Russian Soviet realist painter and art educator
 Ekaterina Mikhailova-Demina (born 1925), hero of the Soviet Union
 Galina Vishnevskaya (1926–2012), opera singer soprano 
 Igor Dmitriev (1927–2008), actor
 Vladimir Kondrashin (1929–1999), basketball coach
 Ninel Kurgapkina (1929–2009), Russian dance teacher and former prima ballerina  
 Yuli Vorontsov (1929–2007), Russian and Soviet diplomat
 Boris Parygin (1930–2012), Russian philosopher, sociologist and social psychology
 Georgy Grechko (born 1931), cosmonaut
 Viktor Korchnoi (born 1931), chess player
 Yevgeny Ukhnalev (born 1931), contemporary artist
 Yevgeny Ukhnalyov (born 1931), artist
 Mark Ermler (1932–2002), conductor
 Alla Osipenko (born 1931), former Soviet ballerina
 Boris Strugatsky (1933–2012), science fiction author
 Georgy Kovenchuk (1933–2015), artist and writer
 Ilya Averbakh (1934–1986), film director
 Ludvig Faddeev (1934–2017), mathematician
 Oleg Golovanov (born 1934), rower
 Tatiana Samoylova (1934–2014), actress
 Nina Timofeeva (1935–2014), Russian ballet dancer
 Yuri Schmidt (1937–2013), human rights lawyer
 Boris Spassky (born 1937), chess grandmaster, the tenth World Chess Champion (1969–1972)
 Vitaly Efimov (born 1938), theoretical physicist
 Boris Melnikov (born 1938), Soviet fencer, won a gold medal in the team sabre event at the 1964 Summer Olympics
 Alexander Ney (born 1939), artist, born in Leningrad
 Joseph Brodsky (1940–1996), Russian and American poet and essayist, Nobel Prize in Literature (1987)
 Irina Gubanova (1940–2000), Russian ballerina and film actress
 Natalia Makarova (born 1940), Soviet-Russian-born prima ballerina and choreographer.
 Leon Petrosjan (born 1940), mathematician
Eduard Vinokurov (1942–2010), Olympic and world champion fencer
 Yakov Eliashberg (born 1946), mathematician
 Andrej Hoteev (born 1946), pianist
 Aleksandr Sokolov (born 1949), politician
 Viktor Novozhilov (1950–1991), wrestler

1951–1960 
 Alexander Belov (1951–1978), Soviet basketball player
 Vladimir Kishkun (born 1951), athlete
 Ilya Klebanov (born 1951), politician
 Dmitry Stukalov (born 1951), hurdler
 Alexei Uchitel (born 1951), film director
 Vitali Baganov (born 1952), actor of film and television
 Vladimir Putin (born 1952), a Russian politician serving as the current President of the Russian Federation since 7 May 2012, previously holding the position from 2000 until 2008.
 Evgenij Kozlov (born 1955), artist
 Alexander Radvilovich (born 1955), composer, pianist and teacher
 Alexander Dityatin (born 1957), former Soviet/Russian artistic gymnast Honoured Master of Sports of the USSR
 Sergei Krikalev (born 1958), cosmonaut

1961–1970 
 Igor Butman (born 1961), jazz saxophonist
 Valeri Broshin (1962–2009), professional football player and manager
 Alexey Parygin (born 1964), artist, art historian
 Peter Chernobrivets (born 1965), composer, musicologist
 Oleg Makarov (born 1962), pair skater
 Viktor Tsoi (1962–1990), musician
 Dmitry Medvedev (born 1965), tenth Prime Minister of Russia and third President of Russia (2008–2012)
 Alexander Khalifman (born 1966), chessmaster (FIDE World Chess Champion in 1999)
 Grigori Perelman (born 1966), mathematician
 Vitaly Pushnitsky (born 1967), artist
 Yulia Makhalina (born 1968), Russian ballet dancer
 Larissa Lezhnina (born 1969), Russian ballerina and a principal dancer with Dutch National Ballet, in Amsterdam
 Anna Podlesnaya (born 1970), Russian ballerina
 Ekaterina Shchelkanova (born 1970), Russian ballerina, singer and actress

1971–1980 
 Victoria Haralabidou (born 1971), Greek-Russian actress
 Konstantin Khabensky (born 1972), actor, born and raised in Saint Petersburg
 Vladimir Volodenkov (born 1972), Olympic rower
 Alexei Urmanov (born 1973), figure skater
 Nikolai Valuev (born 1973), professional boxer
 Vitaly Milonov (born 1974), Russian politician
 Kseniya Rappoport (born 1974), Russian actress
 Konstantin Sakaev (born 1974), chess player
 Andrejs Mamikins (born 1976), Latvian politician and journalist and a Member of the European Parliament
 Vasily Petrenko (born 1976), conductor
 Anastasia Volochkova (born 1976), Russian prima ballerina
 Diana Vishneva (born 1976), principal ballerina with the Kirov/Mariinsky Ballet
 Yevgeniya Isakova (born 1978), hurdler
 Marina Kislova (born 1978), sprinter
 Veronika Part (born 1978), Russian ballet dancer
 Ivan Urgant (born 1978), television personality, showman, actor and musician
 Vyacheslav Malafeev (born 1979), footballer
 Svetlana Pospelova (born 1979), European Indoor 400m champion 
 Svetlana Abrosimova (born 1980), European champion basketball player
 Irina Golub (born 1980), Russian-born ballerina
 Vladimir Karpets (born 1980), road bicycle racer
 Ilona Korstin (born 1980), basketball forward
 Yevgeniya Kuznetsova (born 1980), Olympic gymnast (born in Saint Petersburg and currently based in Sofia, Bulgaria)
 Margarita Levieva (born 1980), Russian-American actress
 Alexei Manziola (born 1980), swimmer
 Yevgeny Sudbin (born 1980), concert pianist
 Alexei Yagudin (born 1980), figure skater, born in Saint Petersburg, lived in US from 1998 but moved back to Saint Petersburg in 2006

1981–1990 
 Natalya Antyukh (born 1981), Russian athlete
 Andrey Arshavin (born 1981), Russian footballer, Arsenal FC
 Anatoli Bogdanov (born 1981), Russian professional footballer
 Olga Dmitrieva (born 1981), Russian professional triathlete
 Mikhail Elgin (born 1981), professional tennis player
 Andrei Ivanov (born 1981), Russian professional ice hockey winger
 Kirill Safronov (born 1981), Russian professional ice hockey defenceman
 Kseniya Sobchak (born 1981), member of political opposition
 Georgy Grebenkov (born 1982), Russian artistic gymnast
 Sergei Slavnov (born 1982), pair skater
 Anastasia Fomina (born 1983), Russian basketball point guard
 Konstantin Menshov (born 1983), figure skater
 Julia Novikova (born 1983), coloratura soprano opera singer
 Pavel Durov (born 1984), entrepreneur
 Svetlana Bolshakova (born 1984), triple jumper
 Igor Denisov (born 1984), association footballer
 Daniil Konstantinov (born 1984), opposition politician, lawyer, human rights activist
 Evgenia Obraztsova (born 1984), ballerina
 Anastasia Stashkevich (born 1984), Russian principal dancer with the Bolshoi Ballet
 Mikhail Ignatiev (born 1985), professional track and road bicycle racer
 Miron Fyodorov aka Oxxxymiron (born 1985), rapper
 Aleksandra Kiryashova (born 1985), pole vaulter
 Svetlana Kuznetsova (born 1985), tennis player
 Maria Mukhortova (born 1985), pair skater
 Nadezhda Skardino (born 1985), Belarusian biathlete
 Alina Somova (born 1985), Russian ballet dancer and principal dancer with the Mariinsky Ballet of Saint Petersburg
 Vladimir Suleimanov (born 1985), former professional footballer
 Ekaterina Yurlova (born 1985), biathlete
 Natalia Ziganshina (born 1985), former gymnast
 Evgeniya Belyakova (born 1986), Russian professional basketball player
 Vadim Bogdanov (born 1986), handball player
 Olga Esina (born 1986), Russian ballerina and First Solo Dancer at the Vienna State Ballet
 Timofey Mozgov (born 1986), professional basketball player
 Anna Nazarova (born 1986), track and field athlete
 Oksana Akinshina (born 1987), actress
 Vladimir Garin (1987–2003), actor, born in Saint Petersburg
 Roman Ovchinnikov (born 1987), former footballer
 Natalia Shliakhtenko (born 1987), professional triathlete
 Aleksei Shvalev (born 1987), professional ice hockey player
 Sofya Skya (born 1987), Russian actress, ballet dancer and acting coach.
 Polina Miller (born 1988), Russian artistic gymnast
 Alexander Enbert (born 1989), pair skater
 Sergey Fesikov (born 1989), swimmer
 Katarina Gerboldt (born 1989), figure skater
 Nadezhda Grishaeva (born 1989), Russian professional basketball player
 Katya Jones (born 1989), Strictly Come Dancing professional dancer, oil heiress
 Tatyana McFadden (born 1989), Russian-born United States Paralympian athlete
 Andriy Yarmolenko (born 1989), Ukrainian football winger
 Anton Yelchin (1989–2016), American-raised actor, born in Saint Petersburg, who left with his parents at the age of six months;  best known for his role in Star Trek as Pavel Chekov, a character who is often implied to be from the city
 Alena Leonova (born 1990), figure skater
 Ksenia Polikarpova (born 1990), Russian female badminton player
 Julia Vlassov (born 1990), Russian American figure skater

1991–2000 
 Ekaterina Kramarenko (born 1991), Russian artistic gymnast
 Alexander Majorov (born 1991), figure skater
 Maxim Matlakov (born 1991), chess grandmaster
 Olga Smirnova (born 1991), prima ballerina with the Bolshoi Ballet
 Alexey Stadler (born 1991), cellist
 Ilya Zakharov (born 1991), diver, Olympics gold medalist (2012)
 Ksenia Makarova (born 1992), figure skater
 Viktor Manakov (born 1992), professional racing cyclist
 Alexey Romashov (born 1992), ski jumper
 Ksenia Stolbova (born 1992), pair skater
 Sergey Karasev (born 1993), professional basketball player
 Samira Mustafaeva (born 1993), Russian Azerbaijani rhythmic gymnast
 Alexander Barabanov (born 1994), ice hockey player
 Anish Giri (born 1994), Russian-born Dutch chess prodigy and Grandmaster
 Tatiana Nabieva (born 1994), gymnast, born in Saint Petersburg
 Alexandra Stepanova (born 1995), ice dancer
 Aleksei Gasilin (born 1996), professional football player
 Ramil Sheydayev (born 1996), Russian-Azerbaijani professional footballer
 Lilia Akhaimova (born 1997), Russian artistic gymnast
 Daniel Koperberg (born 1997), Israeli basketball player
 Mikhail Maltsev (born 1998), ice hockey player
 Alexander Alexeyev (born 1999), ice hockey player
 Pasha Pozdniakova (born 1999), Finnish-Russian Playboy model and social media influencer
 Natalia Safonova (born 1999), Russian Group rhythmic gymnast
 Maria Khoreva (born 2000), Russian ballet dancer and first soloist of the Mariinsky Ballet

21st century 
 Yuri Busse (born 2001), Russian artistic gymnast
 Elena Eremina (born 2001), Russian artistic gymnast
 Maria Sergeeva (born 2001), Russian individual rhythmic gymnast

Date of birth unknown 
 Alice Edun, Gospel and Dance music singer; born in Saint Petersburg before moving to Nigeria at age five (Her mother is Russian, father is Nigerian)

Lived in Saint Petersburg

17th C. & 18th C. 
 Domenico Trezzini (1670–1734), Swiss Italian architect
 Joseph-Nicolas Delisle (1688–1768), French astronomer and cartographer, lived in Saint Petersburg for 22 years
 Harmen van Bol'es (1689–1764), royal master builder from 1713 to 1764. Designed the ship wind vane which is used as an emblem of Saint Petersburg.
 Daniel Bernoulli (1700–1782), Swiss mathematician and physicist, lived and worked in Saint Petersburg
 Francesco Bartolomeo Rastrelli (1700–1771), architect
 Leonhard Euler (1707–1783), Swiss mathematician and physicist, worked in Saint Petersburg and died there.
 Mikhail Lomonosov (1711–1765), Russian polymath, scientist and writer, worked in Saint Petersburg and died there
 Gabriel François Doyen (1726–1806) a French painter.
 Christian Friedrich von Völkner (1728–1796), German translator and historian, worked in Saint Petersburg and died there
 Alexander Suvorov (1730–1800), national hero of Russia, Generalissimo of the Russian Empire, died in Saint Petersburg.
 Stanisław August Poniatowski (1732–1798), Last elected King of Polish–Lithuanian Commonwealth, lover of Catherine the Great, after the Third and final Partition of Poland  prisoner in St Petersburg (1795–98) of her son and successor, Paul I.
 Schneur Zalman of Liadi (1745-1812), rabbi, philosopher, writer, founder and spiritual-leader of Chabad-Lubavitch movement. Recognized as militar supporter of Tsar Alexander I in French Invasion of Russia.
 Giacomo Quarenghi (1744–1817), architect
 Tadeusz Kościuszko (1746–1817), Polish military leader, was imprisoned in Saint Petersburg
 Domenico Cimarosa (1749–1801), Italian opera composer, wrote two operas in Saint Petersburg
 Alexander Radishchev (1749–1802), poet and writer
 Joseph de Maistre (1753–1821), Savoyard philosopher, writer, lawyer, freemason and diplomat, lived in Saint Petersburg for 14 years
 Louis Philippe, comte de Ségur (1753–1830) a French diplomat and historian.
 Agustín de Betancourt (1754–1824), Spanish engineer urban planner of Saint Petersburg
 Heinrich Friedrich Karl vom und zum Stein (1757–1831), exile during Napoleon's reign
 Andrey Voronikhin (1759–1814), architect and painter
 Étienne Dumont (1759–1829), a Swiss French political writer.
 James Walker (c. 1760 - c. 1823), mezzotint engraver invited to Saint Petersburg by Catherine the Great and appointed as "Engraver to Her Imperial Majesty" for a duration of 20 years
 August von Kotzebue (1761–1819), German dramatist and writer, consul in Russia and Germany, from 1780 to 1783 in Saint Petersburg
 Nikolay Karamzin (1766–1826), writer and historian, died in Saint Petersburg
 John Quincy Adams (1767–1848), first U.S. ambassador in Saint Petersburg & 6th President of the United States.
 Ernst Moritz Arndt (1769–1860), German patriotic author and poet, in his function as the secretary of Heinrich Friedrich Karl, baron von und zum Stein
 Vasily Stasov (1769–1848), architect
 Adam Jerzy Czartoryski (1770–1861), Polish statesman, friend of tsars and Tsar Alexander's foreign minister and key in forming the Third Coalition against France.
 Adam Johann von Krusenstern (1770–1846), admiral and explorer, led the first Russian circumnavigation of the globe
 Yuri Lisyansky (1773–1837), explorer
 Joseph Saunders (1773–1845), noted English engraver,  "Historical engraver to the Hermitage" under Paul I
 Pierre Rode (1774–1830), violinist, worked there from 1804 until 1809
 Carlo Rossi (1775–1849), Italian architect
 François-Adrien Boieldieu (1775–1834) a French composer of operas, called "the French Mozart".
 Wladyslaw Grzegorz Branicki (1783–1843), Polish nobleman, landowner, Russian senator and army general
 Vasily Zhukovsky (1783–1852), poet
 Auguste de Montferrand (1786–1858), architect
 Karl Ernst Claus (1796–1864), Baltic German chemist and naturalist
 Imam Shamil (1797–1871), Avar political and religious leader of the Muslim tribes of the Northern Caucasus
 Alexander Pushkin (1799–1837), great Russian poet, died following a duel in Saint Petersburg.

19th C. 
 Fyodor Tyutchev (1803–1873), poet
 Mikhail Glinka (1804–1857), composer.
 Nikolai Gogol (1809–1852), created the memorable image of Saint Petersburg in his fiction
 Vissarion Belinsky (1811–1848), literary critic, 1839–1848 in Saint Petersburg
 Ivan Goncharov (1812–1891), writer, died in Saint Petersburg
 Alexander Herzen (1812–1870), writer and thinker
 Nikolay Zinin (1812–1880) a Russian organic chemist.
 Mikhail Lermontov (1814–1841), writer and poet.
 Taras Shevchenko (1814–1861), a Ukrainian poet, writer and artist died in Saint Petersburg.
 Marius Petipa (1818–1910), Marseille-born Ballet master who worked for nearly 60 years in the Mariinsky Theatre
 Sergey Levitsky (1819–1898), photographer, opened Saint Petersburg's first photo studio, "Light Painting"
 Pafnuty Chebyshev (1821–1894), mathematician
 Fyodor Dostoyevsky (1821–1881), writer lived in Saint Petersburg and died there.
 Nikolay Nekrasov (1821–1878), poet
 Heinrich Schliemann (1822–1890), archaeologist worked as a tradesman based in Saint Petersburg
 Aleksey Pleshcheyev (1825–1893), poet
 Mikhail Saltykov-Shchedrin (1826–1889), writer, satirist
 Carl Heinrich von Siemens (1829–1906), German entrepreneur, had lived there in 1853–1867
 Nikolai Leskov (1831–1895), writer
 Alfred Nobel (1833–1896), Swedish chemist, engineer, innovator, and armaments manufacturer.
 Feliks Sobański (1833–1913), Polish entrepreneur and philanthropist, held in Peter and Paul Fortress on sedition charges
 Dmitri Mendeleev (1834–1907), chemist and inventor, died in Saint Petersburg
 James Abbott McNeill Whistler (1834–1903), American painter, went to school in Saint Petersburg.
 Nicholas of Japan (1836–1912), Russian Orthodox priest, monk, bishop, and saint
 Mily Balakirev (1837–1910), pianist, conductor and composer.
 Modest Mussorgsky (1839–1881), composer, died in Saint Petersburg and is buried there.
 Pyotr Ilyich Tchaikovsky (1840–1893), composer, died in Saint Petersburg, buried there.
 Peter Kropotkin (1842–1921), geographer, economist, activist, philologist, zoologist, evolutionary theorist, philosopher, writer and prominent anarchist.
 Ilya Repin (1844–1930), painter
 Nikolai Rimsky-Korsakov (1844–1908), composer, worked primarily in Saint Petersburg.
 Nicholas Miklouho-Maclay (1846–1888), ethnologist, anthropologist and biologist
 Anna Shabanova (1848–1932), one of the first women doctors in Russia and a women's rights activist; worked all her career at Ol'denburg Children's Hospital in Saint Petersburg
 Ivan Pavlov (1849–1936), physiologist, died in Leningrad
 Opanas Slastion (1855–1933), studied at the Imperial Academy of Arts, lived and worked in Saint Petersburg for several years before returning to Ukraine at the end of 19th century
 Andrey Markov (1856–1922), mathematician
 Alexander Makarov (1857–1919), Imperial Russian Politician, lived in Saint Petersburg 1857–1917
 Alexander Popov (1859–1906), physicist, died in Saint Petersburg
 Anton Arensky (1861–1906), composer
 Alexander Gretchaninov (1864–1956), Romantic composer
 Maud Gonne (1866–1953), Irish actress made her debut in Saint Petersburg
 Carl Gustaf Emil Mannerheim (1867–1951), Finnish military leader and statesman, 6th President of Finland, studied in Saint Petersburg
 Emma Goldman (1869–1940), anarchist
 Grigori Rasputin (1869–1916), Svengali of the last Tsarina murdered in Saint Petersburg
 Alexander Berkman (1870–1936), anarchist
 Vladimir Lenin (1870–1924), communist revolutionary, politician and political theorist took over the capital in 1917.
 Sergei Rachmaninoff (1873–1943), composer
 Nikolai Berdyaev (1874–1948), philosopher, 1908–1922 in Saint Petersburg
 Mikhail Kalinin (1875–1946), mayor after the revolution
 Aleksey Remizov (1877–1957), writer
 Boris Kustodiev (1878–1927), painter
 Kazimir Malevich (1879–1935), painter and art theoretician, died in Leningrad 
 Andrei Bely (1880–1934), wrote the novel Petersburg
 Alexander Grin (1880–1932), writer
 Alexander Kerensky (1881–1970), lawyer and major political leader before the Russian Revolutions of 1917 belonging to a moderate socialist party
 Nikolai Myaskovsky (1881–1950), composer
 Nicolai Hartmann (1882–1950), Baltic German philosopher
 Alexander Belyaev (1884–1942), writer, 1928–1942 in Leningrad
 Isaak Brodsky (1884–1939), painter
 Yevgeny Zamyatin (1884–1937), writer
 Marc Chagall (1887–1985), painter who studied in Saint Petersburg
 Nikolai Vavilov (1887–1943), biologist
 Vladimir K. Zworykin (1888–1982), Russian-American inventor and pioneer of TV technology, studied in Saint Petersburg
 Anna Akhmatova (1889–1966), spent most of her life and died in Leningrad
 Igor Sikorsky (1889–1972), pioneer of aviation, 1903–1906, 1907–1909, 1912–1919
 Vaslav Nijinsky (1890–1950), Ballerino lived and worked in Saint Petersburg
 Sergei Prokofiev (1891–1953), studied since 1904 at the Petersburg Conservatorium
 Vladimir Mayakovsky (1893–1930), poet, lived there from 1915 to 1918

20th C. 
 Theodosius Dobzhansky (1900–1975), biologist, 1924–1927 in Leningrad
 George Gamow (1904–1968), physicist, studied at University of Leningrad in 1923–1929
 Daniel Prenn (1904–1991), Vilnius-born, lived in Saint Petersburg, German, Polish, and British world-top-ten tennis player
 Yuri Knorozov (1922–1999), linguist who made pivotal breakthrough in the decipherment of Maya hieroglyphics
 Olga Ladyzhenskaya (1922–2004), mathematician
 Arkady Strugatsky (1925–1991), science fiction author
 Eduard Khil (1934–2012), Soviet era singer, 1949–2012 in Leningrad/Saint Petersburg
 Rudolf Nureyev (1938–1993), Ballerino graduated from the Vaganova ballet school and worked in the Kirov Ballet
 Yuri Temirkanov (born 1938), conductor
 Mikhail Baryshnikov (born 1948), graduated from the Vaganova ballet school and worked in the Kirov Ballet
 Brian Eno (born 1948), lived briefly in Saint Petersburg during the 1990s
 Valery Gergiev (born 1953), conductor
 Rolandas Paksas (born 1956), Lithuanian politician who was President of Lithuania from 2003 to 2004
 Alexander Sizonenko (1959–2012), Russia's largest man, standing 7 feet 10 inches tall
 Maxim Petrov (born 1965), doctor who killed 12 patients between 1998 and 2000
 Ulyana Lopatkina (born 1973), principal ballerina with Kirov/Mariinsky Ballet, resident of Saint Petersburg since 1984
 Denis Ugarov (born 1975), professional football coach and a former player; made his professional debut in the Russian Second Division in 1993 for FC Zenit-2 St. Petersburg
 Fedor Emelianenko (born 1976), heavyweight mixed martial artist and Sambo fighter
 Andrei Kirilenko (born 1981), NBA player, grew up in Saint Petersburg
 Nu-Nation (formed 2009), nu-metal musical group

See also 
 List of Russians
 List of Russian-language poets
 List of famous Russians
 Ves Petersburg (a series of directories of residents and streets in Saint Petersburg)

External links 

 Celebrities of Saint-Petersburg
 Personalities of Saint-Petersburg

References

List
People
Saint Petersburg